Marriage is the debut album from Canadian rock band Attack in Black, released July 31, 2007. The album was released by Dine Alone Records as both a CD and through digital download. The album won "NXNE Favourite New Indie Record Release" at the 2007 CASBY Awards.

Critical reception

Ben Conoley of Punknews.org praised the band's debut album, saying that "Marriage is an absolutely beautiful blend of punk, rock and folk, with each element coming together almost perfectly with each stylistic influence making appearances at all the right times and almost always with enough show. The songs demonstrate an incredible amount of maturity, which one may not expect from a band's first full-length."

Track listing

Personnel
Adapted credits from the liner notes of Marriage.

Attack in Black
Daniel Tavis Romano – guitar, vocals
Ian Andrew Romano – drums
Spencer Arthur Burton – guitar, vocals
Ian Daniel Kehoe – bass

Additional musicians
Joni Romano, Darlene Romano, Amy Elder – backup vocals on "If All I Thought Were True" and "The Love Between You and I"
Dan Weston – backup vocals on "Young Leaves"
Eric Pridmore – trumpet on "Young Leaves", "If All I Thought Were True", and "The Love Between You and I"
Victor Belcastro – saxophone on "Come What May" and "If All I Thought Were True"

Artwork
Dan Weston – art
Andrew McCracken – layout

Production
Dan Weston – producer, engineering, mixing
Attack in Black – producer
Mark Renner – assistant engineer
Nick Blagona – mastering (Metalworks Studios)
Ian Blurton – additional recording (Chemical Sound)
Dean and Jay – additional engineering (Chemical Sound)

References 

2007 albums
Attack in Black albums
Dine Alone Records albums